Guglielmo Tocco (died in Naples, 22 September 1335) was the governor of the Greek island of Corfu in the 1330s and the founder of the Tocco dynasty.

Guglielmo was born the son of Pietro Tocco, a notary in Melfi, in the Angevin Kingdom of Naples. In 1330/1 he was named governor of Corfu by Philip I of Taranto. 

He was married twice. By his first marriage to Giovanna Torelli he had one son, Pietro Tocco, seneschal of Robert of Taranto and Count of Martina Franca. By his second marriage, to Margaret Orsini, the daughter of John I Orsini, Count palatine of Cephalonia, he had four children:

 Leonardo I Tocco (died 1375/1377), who became Count palatine of Cephalonia and Zakynthos in 1357, beginning the Tocco line that ruled over the Ionian Islands and eventually Epirus
 Nicoletto Tocco (died 1347/1354), who became a monk
 Lisulo or Ludovico Tocco (died 1360), seneschal of Robert of Taranto in 1354
 Margherita Tocco, who became nun at Naples

References

Sources

 
 
 
 

13th-century births
1335 deaths
History of Corfu
Guglielmo
People of the Kingdom of Naples